The canton of Bas-en-Basset is an administrative division of the Haute-Loire department, south-central France. Its borders were modified at the French canton reorganisation which came into effect in March 2015. Its seat is in Bas-en-Basset.

It consists of the following communes:
 
Bas-en-Basset
Beauzac
Boisset
Malvalette
Retournac
Saint-André-de-Chalencon
Solignac-sous-Roche
Tiranges
Valprivas

References

Cantons of Haute-Loire